Frame of Mind is the second studio album by German singer Sandy Mölling. It was released by Starwatch Music on 26 May 2006 in German-speaking Europe, marking her debut with the label following her departure from Cheyenne Records in 2004. Taking her work further into the pop rock genre, Mölling worked with Kiko Masbaum and duo Alain Bertoni and Christian Hamm on most of the album. Frame of Mind debuted and peaked at number 53 on the German Albums Chart and produced the singles "Crash", a The Primitives cover, and "Living Without You".

Track listing

Notes
  denotes co-producer

Personnel and credits 
Credits adapted from the liner notes of Frame of Mind.

Musicians

 Martin Fly – guitar
 Krischan Frehse – bass
 Bassel El Hallak – guitar
 Christian Hamm – instruments
 Guido Jöris – backing vocals
 Kent Larsson – keyboards

 Kiko Masbaum – backing vocals, keyboards
 Sandy Mölling – backing vocals, lead vocals
 Flo Peil – drums, guitar
 Tsega Tebege – backing vocals
 Jan van der Toorn – backing vocals

Technical

 Alain Bertoni – producer, recording
 Martin Fly – programming
 Christian Hamm – producer, recording
 Jeo – mixing
 Kent Larsson – producer, recording

 Kiko Masbaum – producer, recording
 Ronald Prent – mixing
 Rob Sannen – mixing assistance
 Reinhard Schaub – mixing

Charts

References

External links

2006 albums
Sandy Mölling albums